The Time of the Daleks is a Big Finish Productions audio drama based on the long-running British science fiction television series Doctor Who. It is the last serial in the Dalek Empire arc, which began with The Genocide Machine and continued in The Apocalypse Element and The Mutant Phase.

Plot
The Doctor is confused enough when he finds that Charley has never heard of William Shakespeare. But when he travels to Britain in the near future and discovers a leader obsessed with watching Shakespeare's plays — and the Daleks wanting to help her — the mystery grows more sinister. Can the Daleks really claim to be the 'Masters of Time'?

Cast
The Doctor — Paul McGann
Charley Pollard — India Fisher
The Orator — Don Warrington
Dalek Voices — Nicholas Briggs
General Mariah Learman — Dot Smith
Viola — Nicola Boyce
Major Ferdinand — Julian Harries
Kitchen Boy — Jem Bassett
Priestly — Mark McDonnell
Hart — Lee Moone
Professor Osric — Ian Brooker
Mark Anthony — Ian Potter
Army Officer — Ian Potter
Marcus — Robert Curbishley

Continuity
The kitchen boy in this story is eventually revealed to be a young William Shakespeare, dislocated from his proper time. The short story "Apocrypha Bipedium" by Ian Potter (in the collection Short Trips: Companions) is set immediately following The Time of the Daleks, and involves the Doctor's attempt to return young Shakespeare to his own time. Also featuring Vicki, it deals with the Doctor's previous encounters with Shakespeare and tries to reconcile Vicki's apparently happy ending as Cressida in The Myth Makers with the tragic ending of Troilus and Cressida.

Outside references
The dialogue in this play is loaded with direct and indirect quotations from the plays of Shakespeare, but several character names are also taken from the plays, such as Osric from Hamlet, Viola from Twelfth Night and Ferdinand from The Tempest.  Mariah Learman's name could also be a reference to the title character of King Lear.

External links
Big Finish Productions - The Time of the Daleks

2002 audio plays
Eighth Doctor audio plays
Dalek audio plays
Fiction set in the 2050s